Porte Doree may refer to:

 Palais de la Porte Dorée, an exhibit hall located on the edge of the Bois de Vincennes at 293, avenue Daumesnil, XIIe arrondissement, Paris
 Porte Dorée (Paris Métro), a station on line 8 of the Paris Métro